Fay Crocker (2 August 1914 – 16 September 1983) was a Uruguayan professional golfer who played on the LPGA Tour. In her career, she won 11 LPGA tournaments, including two major championships, the 1955 U.S. Women's Open and 1960 Titleholders Championship. Crocker was the oldest player to win her first LPGA event, the first U.S. Women's Open champion from outside the United States, and the oldest women's major champion.

Early life
Crocker was born in Montevideo, Uruguay, on 2 August 1914. Her father Frederick was a rancher. Also a golfer, he was a 27-time national champion in Uruguay. Crocker's mother, Helen, was a national champion in multiple sports, playing tennis and golf. She was a 6-time Uruguayan golf champion. Fay Crocker began playing golf at the age of six.

Amateur career
Crocker became an accomplished player in South America, claiming her home country's national title on 20 occasions and Argentina's championship another 14.

Crocker traveled to the United States to compete in the U.S. Women's Amateur as early as 1939. After bowing out of the match-play event in the third round, she did not play in the tournament again for 11 years. For a time, Crocker worked in Buenos Aires, Argentina, as a U.S. Embassy clerk. In 1950, she returned to the U.S. Women's Amateur and advanced to the fourth round before losing to Mae Murray in 27 holes, nine more than the regulation 18. At the time, it was the longest playoff in a women's match-play event organized by the United States Golf Association.

Professional career
In 1954, Crocker became a professional golfer when she was 39 years old. Her professional debut came at the Sea Island Open, where she shot a course-record 69 in the final round and posted a seventh-place result.

In Crocker's 19th professional tournament, the 1955 Serbin Open, she won for the first time. She is the oldest player to win for the first time on the LPGA Tour as of 2013, doing so at the age of 40. Later in 1955, Crocker posted a seven-stroke victory in the Wolverine Open. At the Women's Western Open, she started the final round one stroke out of the lead and finished tied for second, two strokes behind winner Patty Berg. Crocker added to her two previous wins in 1955 by claiming a victory in the U.S. Women's Open. In a tournament that featured 45-mile-per-hour wind gusts, Crocker was the only player to finish in under 300 strokes; her final score of 299 was four strokes ahead of runners-up Louise Suggs and Mary Lena Faulk. The win made Crocker the first U.S. Women's Open champion from a country other than the United States. In addition, she became the first golfer ever to finish a U.S. Women's Open round in fewer than 70 strokes, achieving the feat in the second round with a 68. At the end of the season, Golf Digest named Crocker the Most Improved Female Professional Golfer.

In 1956, Crocker again won the Serbin Open (also known as the Miami Beach Open), and added a victory at the St. Louis Open. Crocker won two tournaments in 1957: her third straight Serbin Open and the Triangle Round Robin. At the 1958 LPGA Championship, she finished as the runner-up, six strokes behind winner Mickey Wright. That year, she won the Havana Biltmore Open and Waterloo Open, making it her fourth consecutive season with multiple victories.

Crocker won two events early in the 1960 season, beginning with the Lake Worth Open. Then, in March 1960, she claimed a victory in the Titleholders Championship; her four-round score of 303 was seven strokes ahead of the closest competitor, Kathy Cornelius. Crocker was 45 years old when she won the Titleholders; as of 2013, she is the oldest major champion in LPGA Tour history. Having competed in almost all LPGA events in the six-year stretch from 1955 to 1960, Crocker is credited with 11 official tour wins. She stopped playing on the LPGA Tour in 1961, having amassed $73,410 in earnings, which placed her among the top 10 in the LPGA's career money list at the time of her retirement.

Retirement and death
After her retirement, Crocker moved to Argentina, where she resided for most of her life after professional golf. On 16 September 1983, when Crocker was 69 years old, she died in Montevideo.

Professional wins

LPGA Tour wins
1955 Serbin Open, Wolverine Open, U.S. Women's Open
1956 Serbin Open, St. Louis Open
1957 Serbin Open, Triangle Round Robin
1958 Havana Biltmore Open, Waterloo Open
1960 Lake Worth Open, Titleholders Championship

Other wins
1957 Hot Springs 4-Ball (with Marilynn Smith)

Major championships

Wins (2)

See also
List of golfers with most LPGA Tour wins

References

Uruguayan female golfers
LPGA Tour golfers
Winners of LPGA major golf championships
Sportspeople from Montevideo
Burials at The British Cemetery Montevideo
1914 births
1983 deaths